Broken Chains is the title of the only solo album released by Malcolm Wild, formerly of the duo Malcolm & Alwyn. His former partner, Alwyn Wall, makes a brief appearance on the album. The duo got together the following year for a one-off live album.

Track listing

Side one
 "Love is You" (Malcolm Wild)
 "Broken Chains" (Henry Cutrona/Malcolm Wild)
 "Was it You My Love" (Malcolm Wild)
 "You're the Reason" (Malcolm Wild)
 "Dreams" (Malcolm Wild)

Side two
 "The Best is You" (Malcolm Wild)
 "Morning Star (Alwyn Wall)
 "Pride (Before a Fall) (Malcolm Wild)
 "When You Call" (Malcolm Wild)
 "The Pirze" (Henry Cutrona)

Personnel
Malcolm Wild: Vocals and Autoharp
John Pac: Backing vocals and Mandolin
Sue McClellan: Backing vocals
Rick Godsall: Piano
Colin Owen: Organ, Synthesizer and Bass
Darrell Mansfield: Harmonica
Don Gerber: Guitar and Banjo
Mike Minardi: Guitar
Richard Cimino: Guitar
Norman Barratt: Guitar
Stan Linder: Bass
Greg Gustafson: Drums
Hugh Thomas: Saxophone
Gerry Freeman: Drums
John Wickham: Guitar
Steve Kara: Bass and Guitar
Mart Goetz: Electric piano
Jeff Crandle: Squeeze box
Henry Cutrona: Bass
John Mehler: Drums
Alwyn Wall: Vocals and Guitar
Spud SPurling: Bass
Pete Thompson: Drums

Production notes
Produced by John Pac
Engineered by Colin Owen and Chris Taylor
Recorded at Maranatha Studios, Santa Ana, California and The Old Smith Recording Studio, Worcester, England

References

1980 debut albums